Characiosiphon is a genus of green algae in the family Characiosiphonaceae.

References

External links

Chlamydomonadales genera
Chlamydomonadales